The Legislative Assembly of Rhodesia was the legislature of Southern Rhodesia and then Rhodesia from 1924 to 1970.

Background
In 1898, the Southern Rhodesian Legislative Council, Southern Rhodesia's first elected representative body, was founded. Much of the decisions regarding the administration of Southern Rhodesia was made by the British South Africa Company (BSAC). When BSAC rule was terminated in 1923 and Responsible Government achieved, the Legislative Council was replaced by the Legislative Assembly. Under the Constitution, there was provision for the establishment of an upper house to be known as the Legislative Council, but none was ever established, meaning that the Legislative Assembly remained a unicameral legislature.

Franchise
Modelled after the British House of Commons, the Assembly had limitations placed on its powers of legislation, as the British Crown reserved the right to block legislation and allowed only legislation on internal matters to be discussed in the parliament. 

The Letters Patent granting the colony the right to self-government in 1923 made no change to the pre-existing franchise. The law provided that voters must have been resident in Southern Rhodesia for at least six months, and have the ability to complete the claim form for the electoral register in their own handwriting if the registrar required, and to write from dictation 50 words in the English language. In addition, voters had to meet one of three criteria for their financial means: either occupy property worth £150 in their Electoral District, or own a registered mining claim within the colony (for which residence was not required), or receive annual salary of £100 in the colony.

Electoral procedure
No change was made to the basic electoral procedure, which continued to be the first past the post system, cast by means of the secret ballot.

Electoral districts
The Letters Patent created a Legislative Assembly with 30 members, and for simplicity the 15 electoral districts set the previous year for the Legislative Council were used for the new assembly, but with each district returning two members. Voters were therefore entitled to two votes. Until 1961 there were technically no restrictions on the ability for native Africans to vote, but a high property qualification ensured that few were entitled to vote. This was altered in 1958, when a special voters' roll was created for Africans, although Africans were limited to voting for 15 Assembly members while Europeans were entitled to elect 50 members.

Election results

The following table reflects only those members elected from general roll electoral divisions.

References

Legislative Assembly
Historical legislatures